Mycalesis, the bushbrowns, are a genus of brush-footed butterflies. They are common in the warm regions from Central Asia to Australia, and have a high diversity in South Asia and the Wallacea.

They are notably polymorphic, with wet- and dry-season forms differing in many species, especially as regards size and number of underwing eyespots.

Mycalesis superficially resemble the species Orsotriaena medus, but can readily be identified by the number of spots.

Species

Listed alphabetically:
 Mycalesis adamsoni Watson, 1897 – Watson's bushbrown
 Mycalesis adolphei (Guérin-Ménéville, 1843) – redeye bushbrown
 Mycalesis aethiops Butler, 1868
 Mycalesis amoena Druce, 1873
 Mycalesis anaxioides Marshall & de Nicéville, 1883
 Mycalesis annamitica Fruhstorfer, 1906 – Annam bushbrown, tawny bush-brown
 Mycalesis anapita Moore, [1858]
 Mycalesis anaxias Hewitson, 1862 – white-bar bushbrown
 Mycalesis arabella Fruhstorfer, 1906
 Mycalesis aramis Hewitson, 1866
 Mycalesis asophis Hewitson, 1862
 Mycalesis atrata Röber, 1887
 Mycalesis barbara Grose-Smith, 1894
 Mycalesis bazochii  (Guérin-Méneville, 1831)
 Mycalesis biformis Rothschild, 1916
 Mycalesis bilineata Fruhstorfer, 1906
 Mycalesis bisaya C. & R. Felder, 1863
 Mycalesis cacodaemon Kirsch, 1877
 Mycalesis comes Grose-Smith, 1894
 Mycalesis deficiens Fruhstorfer, 1906
 Mycalesis discobolus Fruhstorfer, 1906
 Mycalesis dohertyi Elwes, 1891
 Mycalesis drusillodes (Oberthür, 1894)
 Mycalesis duponcheli (Guérin-Méneville, 1830)
 Mycalesis durga Grose-Smith & Kirby, 1896
 Mycalesis elia Grose-Smith, 1894
 Mycalesis evansii Tytler, 1914 – Tytler's bushbrown
 Mycalesis evara Fruhstorfer, 1906
 Mycalesis felderi Butler, 1868
 Mycalesis francisca (Stoll, [1780]) – lilacine bushbrown
 Mycalesis francisca formosana Fruhstorfer, 1908
 Mycalesis fuscum (C. & R. Felder, 1860) – Malayan bush-brown
 Mycalesis giamana Parsons, 1986
 Mycalesis gotama Moore, 1857 – Chinese bushbrown
 Mycalesis gotama nanda Fruhstorfer, 1908
 Mycalesis heri Moore, 1857 – Moore's bushbrown
 Mycalesis horsfieldi (Moore, [1892])Malaysia, Java, Celebes. See [maps]  – Horsfield's bush brown
 Mycalesis igilia Fruhstorfer, 1911 – small long-brand bushbrown
 Mycalesis igoleta C. & R. Felder, 1863
 Mycalesis inayoshii Aoki & Yamaguchi, 1995
 Mycalesis inopia Fruhstorfer, 1908
 Mycalesis intermedia (Moore, [1892]) – intermediate bushbrown
 Mycalesis ita C. & R. Felder, 1863
 Mycalesis itys C. & R. Felder, [1867] – Itys bush brown
 Mycalesis janardana Moore, 1857 – Common Bush Brown, Janardana Bush Brown, Mottled Bush-Brown
 Mycalesis khasia Evans, 1920 – palebrand bushbrown
 Mycalesis lepcha (Moore, 1880) – Lepcha bushbrown
 Mycalesis madjicosa Butler, 1868
 Mycalesis maianeas Hewitson, 1864
 Mycalesis malsarida Butler, 1868 – plain bushbrown
 Mycalesis malsara Moore, 1857 – white-line bushbrown
 Mycalesis mamerta (Stoll, [1780]) – blind-eye bushbrown
 Mycalesis mamerata davisoni – Palni bushbrown
 Mycalesis manii Doherty, 1886
 Mycalesis maura Grose-Smith, 1894
 Mycalesis mnasicles Hewitson, 1864
 Mycalesis meeki Rothschild, 1915
 Mycalesis mehadeva (Boisduval, 1832)
 Mycalesis mercea Evans (nomen nudum?) – Pachmarhi bushbrown
 Mycalesis messene Hewitson, 1862
 Mycalesis mestra Hewitson, 1862 – white-edged bushbrown
 Mycalesis mineus (Linnaeus, 1758) – dark-branded bushbrown
 Mycalesis misenus de Nicéville, 1889 – salmon-branded bushbrown
 Mycalesis mnasicles Hewitson, 1864
 Mycalesis moorei C. & R. Felder, [1867]
 Mycalesis mucia Hewitson, 1862
 Mycalesis mulleri Tennent, 2000
 Mycalesis mynois Hewitson, 1864
 Mycalesis mystes de Nicéville, 1891 - many-tufted bushbrown
 Mycalesis nala C. & R. Felder, 1859
 Mycalesis nerida Grose-Smith, 1902
 Mycalesis nicotia Westwood, [1850] – bright-eye bushbrown
 Mycalesis oculus Marshall, 1880 – red-disc bushbrown
 Mycalesis oroatis Hewitson, 1864
 Mycalesis orseis Hewitson, 1864 – purple bushbrown
 Mycalesis panthaka  Fruhstorfer, 1909
 Mycalesis patiana Eliot, 1969
 Mycalesis pitana Staudinger, [1897]
 Mycalesis patnia Moore, 1857 – glad-eye bushbrown
 Mycalesis perseoides (Moore, [1892]) – Pachmarhi bushbrown
 Mycalesis perseus (Fabricius, 1775) – dingy bushbrown or common bushbrown
 Mycalesis perseus blasius (Fabricius, 1798)
 Mycalesis pitana Staudinger, [1897]
 Mycalesis phidon Hewitson, 1862
 Mycalesis radza Moore, 1878
 Mycalesis rama (Moore, 1892) – Cingalese bushbrown
 Mycalesis sangaica Butler, 1877 – single ring bushbrown
 Mycalesis sangaica mara Fruhstorfer, 1908
 Mycalesis shiva (Boisduval, 1832)
 Mycalesis siamica Riley & Godfrey, 1921
 Mycalesis sirius (Fabricius, 1775)
 Mycalesis splendens Mathew, 1887
 Mycalesis suaveolens Wood-Mason & de Nicéville, 1883 – Wood-Mason's bushbrown
 Mycalesis suaveolens kagina Fruhstorfer, 1908
 Mycalesis subpersa Rothschild, 1915
 Mycalesis sudra C. & R. Felder, [1867]
 Mycalesis tagala C. & R. Felder, 1863
 Mycalesis terminus (Fabricius, 1775) – orange bushbrown
 Mycalesis thailandica Aoki & Yamaguchi, 1984
 Mycalesis thyateira (Fruhstorfer, 1911)
 Mycalesis treadawayi Schröder, 1976
 Mycalesis unica Leech, [1892]
 Mycalesis valeria Grose-Smith, 1900
 Mycalesis valeriana Grose-Smith, 1900
 Mycalesis visala Moore, [1858] – long-brand bushbrown
 Mycalesis visala subdita – Tamil bushbrown
 Mycalesis wayewa Doherty, 1891
 Mycalesis zonata Matsumura, 1909 – South China bushbrown

See also
Orsotriaena

References

 
Satyrini
Nymphalidae genera
Taxa named by Jacob Hübner